Arcoptilia gizan is a moth of the family Pterophoridae. It is known from Ethiopia, Somalia, Oman, Saudi Arabia and Yemen.

References

Exelastini
Insects of Ethiopia
Fauna of Somalia
Moths of the Arabian Peninsula
Moths of Africa
Moths described in 1985